Hezion was a king of Aram Damascus according to the genealogy given in the Books of Kings, where Ben-Hadad I is said to be the “son of Tabrimmon, the son of Hezion, king of Aram, who lived in Damascus." Shamshi-ilu fought against Hezion of Damascus  in 773-2 BCE and extracted tribute from him. In the 19th century many scholars equated him with Rezon the Syrian, an enemy of Solomon.

See also
 List of Syrian monarchs
 Timeline of Syrian history 
Aramean kings

References

8th-century BC Kings of Syria
Aramean kings
Monarchs of the Hebrew Bible
Kings of Syria
Books of Kings people